Réal Bossé is a Canadian actor from Quebec who performs mostly in francophone films and television. The son of farmers, Bossé grew up in Rivière-Bleue, Quebec.  He won a Jutra Award in 2008 as Best Performance by an Actor in a Supporting Role in Continental, a Film Without Guns, as well as two Gémeaux Award in 2011 for writing and acting in the television series 19-2. Bossé was part of the cast of The Decline (film), which was released in 2020. He is also a writer and actor on File D'Attente, a dramatic comedy airing in Quebec.

Filmography

References

External links
 

Year of birth missing (living people)
Living people
Canadian male film actors
Canadian male television actors
Male actors from Quebec
Best Supporting Actor Jutra and Iris Award winners